Dadva is a village and municipality in the Masally Rayon of Azerbaijan.  It has a population of 4,233.

References 

Populated places in Masally District